Stormy Weather: The Music of Harold Arlen is a compilation tribute album of Harold Arlen songs, released by Sony in February 2003 as a companion album to the film of the same name. The album was produced by Hal Willner.

Track listing
 "It's Only a Paper Moon", performed by Rufus Wainwright – 4:44
 "As Long as I Live", performed by Shannon McNally – 3:32
 "I Gotta Right to Sing the Blues", performed by Mark Anthony Thompson – 6:08 
 "Stormy Weather / Ill Wind (Medley)", performed by Debbie Harry – 5:20 
 "I Had a Love Once", performed by Jimmy Scott – 2:53
 "Kickin' the Gong Around", performed by David Johansen – 3:26 
 "Last Night When We Were Young", performed by Harold Arlen – 3:12 
 "I've Got the World on a String", performed by Hawksley Workman & Steve Weisberg – 3:46 
 "Blues in the Night", performed by Mary Margaret O'Hara & Steve Weisberg – 4:44 
 "Minnie the Moocher's Wedding Day", performed by The Boswell Sisters with The Dorsey Brothers Orchestra – 3:06 
 "Get Happy", performed by Eric Mingus – 3:43 
 "Come Rain Or Come Shine", performed by Sandra Bernhard – 3:05 
 "I Wonder What Became of Me", performed by Rufus Wainwright – 3:38 
 "The Man That Got Away", performed by Ranee Lee – 4:05 
 "Ac-Cent-Tchu-Ate the Positive", performed by Steve Bernstein and Mary Margaret O'Hara – 2:54 
 "Over the Rainbow", performed by Jimmy Scott – 2:58 
 "Stormy Weather", performed by Ranee Lee – 4:25

Personnel

Ray Anderson – trombone
Harold Arlen – arranger, performer
Tex Arnold – piano, backing vocalist
Joe Ascione – drums
Rick Baptist – trumpet
Steve Berlin – horn
Sandra Bernhard – performer
Steven Bernstein – trumpet, arranger
Eddie Bert – trombone, backing vocalist
Chris Bleth – oboe
The Boswell Sisters – performer
Greg Cohen – bass, arranger
Jim Cox – piano
Cenovia Cummins – violin
Ian Cuttler – art direction, design
The Dorsey Brothers – performer
Andrew Downing – bass
Tim Emmons – bass
Peter Erskine – drums
Lawrence Feldman – clarinet, alto saxophone, backing vocalist
Simon Fryer – cello
Sam Furnace – baritone saxophone
David Gale – trumpet, backing vocalist
Jack Gale – trombone, arranger, backing vocalist
Grant Geissman – guitar
Vince Giordano – bass, backing vocalist
Sophie Giraud – photography
Richard Greene – violin
John Gzowski – guitar
Debbie Harry – performer
David Hidalgo – accordion
Dan Higgins – saxophone
Viliam Hrubovcak – photography
Greg Huckins – saxophone
Fujice Imajishi – violin
Scott Irvine – tuba
David Johansen – performer
John "Woog" Johnson – clarinet, tenor saxophone
Alastair Kay – trombone
Peter Kent – concert master
Arnie Kinsella – drums, backing vocalist
Brian Koonin – banjo, guitar, arranger, backing vocalist
Ron Lawrence – viola
Emily Lazar – mastering

Ranee Lee – performer
J.T. Lewis – drums
Eric Liljestrand – engineer, mixing
John MacLeod – trumpet
Rusty McCarthy – guitar
Shannon McNally – performer
Michael Melvoin – piano
Eric Mingus – performer
Maxim Moston – violin
Roy Nathanson – arranger, alto saxophone
Milton Nelson – orchestration
Mary Margaret O'Hara – arranger, performer
Earl Palmer – drums
Van Dyke Parks – arranger, conductor
Mark Pender – trumpet, backing vocalist
Bucky Pizzarelli – guitar
Mark Promane – flute, alto saxophone
Jon Regen – arranger, keyboards
Sarah Register – assistant mastering engineer
Gerald Robinson – bassoon
Jay Rodriguez – tenor saxophone
Adam Rogers – guitar
John Rosenberg – music contractor
Jane Scarpantoni – arranger, conductor
Terrence Schonig – percussion
Little Jimmy Scott – performer
Lee Sklar – bass
Roxanne Slimak – art direction, design
Michael Sloski – drums
James Spragg – trumpet
Edmund Stein – violin
Rob Thomas – violin
Ernie Tollar – flute, alto saxophone
Jerry Vivino – clarinet, tenor saxophone, backing vocalist
Rufus Wainwright – arranger, performer
Larry Weinstein – liner notes
Steve Weisberg – arranger, conductor
Perry White – flute, baritone saxophone, tenor saxophone
Sharon Williams – choir master
Hal Willner – producer, liner notes
Chuck Wilson – alto saxophone, backing vocalist
Hawksley Workman – performer
Maurice Wozniak – euphonium
Garo Yellin – cello

References

External links
Official site

2003 compilation albums
Albums produced by Hal Willner
Harold Arlen tribute albums
Sony Records compilation albums